The village of Cabo Matapalo is located at the outermost point of the Osa Peninsula in the southern Pacific coastal area of Costa Rica.

Cabo Matapalo, commonly referred to as Matapalo, is a small beach community located at the tip of the Osa Peninsula, approximately an hour south of Puerto Jimenez. This area is recognized for its sustainability initiatives, as most of the lodges and cabins rely on solar energy. The beaches in the Matapalo area received the Blue Ecological Flag for maintaining the natural beauty of the area and minimizing the carbon footprint of those living and visiting the area. The Playa Matapalo area includes secluded, untouched beaches with abundant plant life and animal activity, including howler monkeys and various birds. Cabo Matapalo is also home to tourist attractions such as Corcovado National Park, King Louis Waterfall, and Cano Island, an island 20 km off the mainland used mainly for fishing.

There is an active lighthouse on the point.

See also
 List of lighthouses in Costa Rica

References

External links
 Cabo Matapalo, South Puntarenas
"Cabo Matapalo"

Populated places in Puntarenas Province
Lighthouses in Costa Rica